The 1966–67 Bundesliga was the fourth season of the Bundesliga, West Germany's premier football league. It began on 20 August 1966 and ended on 3 June 1967. 1860 Munich were the defending champions.

Competition modus
Every team played two games against each other team, one at home and one away. Teams received two points for a win and one point for a draw. If two or more teams were tied on points, places were determined by goal average. The team with the most points were crowned champions while the two teams with the fewest points were relegated to their respective Regionalliga divisions.

Team changes to 1965–66
Borussia Neunkirchen and Tasmania Berlin were relegated to the Regionalliga after finishing in the last two places. They were replaced by Fortuna Düsseldorf and Rot-Weiss Essen, who won their respective promotion play-off groups.

Season overview
The 1966–67 season was surprisingly won by Eintracht Braunschweig. The Lower Saxony side, located near the border to the Soviet occupation zone, had previously been a mid-table team and were not expected to have anything to do with the title race before the season. But a strong defense, which only allowed 27 goals in 34 games, an unexpectedly even-balanced league and struggling opposition (for example, runners-up 1860 Munich were in 17th place after one third of the season before starting a comeback) eventually benefitted the team of coach Helmuth Johannsen.

In European competitions, the Cup Winners' Cup was transferred from Dortmund to another West German team as FC Bayern beat Rangers from Scotland on a Franz Roth goal in the final at Nuremberg. The team from Munich also defended their domestic cup title, enabling finalists Hamburger SV, who finished the season in a dismal 14th place, to enter the Cup Winners' Cup as well.

At the bottom side of the table, newly promoted sides Fortuna Düsseldorf and Rot-Weiss Essen had to leave the league again after only one year. The competitional differences between the professional Bundesliga and the semi-professional Regionalligen had already become very difficult to compensate so that the demotion of both teams was inevitable the more the season continued.

On a minor note, Meidericher SV was renamed MSV Duisburg effective to the start of the year 1967.

Team overview

League table

Results

Top goalscorers
28 goals
  Lothar Emmerich (Borussia Dortmund)
  Gerd Müller (FC Bayern Munich)

18 goals
  Herbert Laumen (Borussia Mönchengladbach)

17 goals
  Christian Müller (Karlsruher SC)

15 goals
  Josef Heynckes (Borussia Mönchengladbach)
  Bernd Rupp (Borussia Mönchengladbach)
  Lothar Ulsaß (Eintracht Braunschweig)
  Reinhold Wosab (Borussia Dortmund)

14 goals
  Hans Küppers (TSV 1860 Munich)

13 goals
  Johannes Löhr (1. FC Köln)

Champion squad

See also
 1966–67 DFB-Pokal

References

External links
 DFB Bundesliga archive 1966/1967

Bundesliga seasons
1
Germany